William Coffin may refer to:

 William Coffin (courtier) (1495–1538), courtier at the court of King Henry VIII of England
 William Anderson Coffin (1855–1925), American landscape and figure painter
 William Haskell Coffin (1878–1941), painter and commercial artist
 William Sloane Coffin Sr. (1879–1933), American businessman
 William Sloane Coffin (1924–2006), Christian clergyman and peace activist
 Bill Coffin (born 1970), writer of novels and role-playing games